Tederal Duralle White (born May 29, 1976) is the current offensive assistant and quarterbacks coach for the Houston Texans. Before coaching the NFL team in 2022, White played for the Frankfurt Galaxy and Barcelona Dragons as part of NFL Europe in the early 2000s. From 2003 to 2005, White was the backup quarterback for the Montreal Alouettes in the Canadian Football League. With both leagues, White had a combined total of 2,568 passing yards, 20 touchdowns and 19 interceptions.

In college football, White started working as a positions coach for Texas Southern during the late 2000s. Throughout the 2010s, White continued to coach college football with Southern, Howard, Arkansas-Pine Bluff, and Prairie View A&M. He also was a coach for the DC Defenders in the XFL and Grambling State during the 2020s. White was inducted into the Mid-Eastern Athletic Conference Hall of Fame in 2010.

Early life and high school career
White was born on May 29, 1976 in Baton Rouge, Louisiana. His parents separated when he was an infant. White was a basketball and football player while he attended Glen Oaks High School. With Glen Oaks, White and his team reached the semifinals of the Class 5A championship held by the Louisiana High School Athletic Association. After high school, he originally planned on going to Southern University but later decided to enroll in Howard University.

College career
In 1995, White joined the Howard Bison football team as their quarterback while he was a redshirt. During the 1995 NCAA Division I-AA football season, White had a kidney injury in October 1995. He did not play for the remainder of the season and returned to the Bisons in 1996. At the end of the year, White and Howard defeated Southern at the 1996 Heritage Bowl. During the 1996-97 season, White and his team received the Black college football national championship after their ten wins and two losses.

During this season, White broke the Howard record for most career passing yards that was held by Jay Walker. For the MEAC, White had the most passing yards in 1996 and 1998. After leaving Howard University in 1998, White set Mid-Eastern Athletic Conference career records with 9,808 passing yards and 92 passing touchdowns. His career records in the MEAC have remained for over 20 years. As a NCAA I-AA football player, White held the season record for passing efficiency in 1996 with 176.2 points. By 2006, White was in the top-10 for most passing touchdowns and the top 25 for most passing yards for his career records.

Professional career
White began his professional football career in the National Football League. In the late 1990s, White was signed with the Jacksonville Jaguars, Tampa Bay Buccaneers and Kansas City Chiefs but did not play any regular season games. He then moved on to NFL Europe to play for the Frankfurt Galaxy and Barcelona Dragons in the early 2000s. In the CFL, White was a backup quarterback for the Montreal Alouettes from 2003 to 2005. During his time with the Alouettes, White appeared in the 2004 CFL East Division Final game against the Toronto Argonauts after quarterback Anthony Calvillo was injured. After his final gridiron football season in 2005, White had a combined total of 2568 passing yards, 20 touchdowns and 19 interceptions.

Coaching career

Early years
Outside of quarterbacking, White was a position coach for the Texas Southern Tigers football team from 2006 to 2008. He then became an offensive coordinator for the Southern Jaguars, Howard Bison, Arkansas-Pine Bluff Golden Lions and Prairie View A&M Panthers throughout the 2010s. While at Pine Bluff, White was the interim head coach in 2017 after the university decided to replace Monte Coleman with a new head coach for their football team.

DC Defenders
In 2019, White was named quarterbacks coach for the DC Defenders of the XFL. White was with the Defenders during the 2020 XFL season before the league folded that year.

Houston Texans
On February 21, 2022, White was hired as offensive assistant and quarterbacks coach for the Houston Texans. He had previously worked for the Grambling State Tigers football team as an offensive coordinator before joining the Texans.

Awards and personal life
White was named Most Valuable Player for the MEAC and the Heritage Bowl in 1996. That year, White was also named the Offensive Player of the Year for the MEAC. He became a member of the Mid-Eastern Athletic Conference Hall of Fame in 2010 and the Howard University Hall Of Fame in 2014. While playing football at Howard, White was nicknamed "Sweet Flight". White is married to Ladricca White and together they have a daughter.

References

External links
Stats Crew

1976 births
Living people
American football quarterbacks
Canadian football quarterbacks
American players of Canadian football
DC Defenders coaches
Howard Bison football players
Frankfurt Galaxy players
Barcelona Dragons players
Montreal Alouettes players
Texas Southern Tigers football coaches
Howard Bison football coaches
Arkansas–Pine Bluff Golden Lions football coaches
Prairie View A&M Panthers football coaches
Southern Jaguars football coaches
Kansas City Chiefs players
Tampa Bay Buccaneers players
Jacksonville Jaguars players
Houston Texans coaches